The Journal of Soft Computing in Civil Engineering is a quarterly peer-reviewed open-access scientific journal covering soft computing applications in civil engineering. It was established in 2017 and is a member of the Committee on Publication Ethics. The editor-in-chief is Hosein Naderpour. The journal is indexed and abstracted in Scopus.

References

External links

Publications established in 2017
Quarterly journals
Creative Commons Attribution-licensed journals
Civil engineering journals
English-language journals
Computer science journals